BAFE Fire Safety Register is an independent fire safety registration body for the United Kingdom. BAFE establish, develop and monitor schemes for UKAS (United Kingdom Accreditation Service) Accredited Third Party Certification for the fire safety industry.

Schemes 
UKAS (United Kingdom Accreditation Service) Accredited Third Party Certification Bodies licensed to deliver the BAFE Schemes offer independent assessment of the following BAFE Schemes:

 Competency of Portable Fire Extinguisher Organisations and Technicians (BAFE Scheme no. SP101)
 Fire Detection and Alarm Systems (BAFE Scheme no. SP203-1)
 Fixed Gaseous Fire Suppression Systems (BAFE Scheme no. SP203-3)
 Emergency Lighting Systems (BAFE Scheme no. SP203-4)
 Life Safety Fire Risk Assessment (BAFE Scheme no. SP205)
 Kitchen Fire Protection Systems (BAFE Scheme no. SP206)
 LPS 1014 Fire Detection and Alarm Systems (BAFE Scheme no. SP201) - Acknowledging Building Research Establishment LPCB LPS 1014 Certification
 LPS 1204 Fixed Extinguishing Systems (BAFE Scheme no. SP202) - Acknowledging Building Research Establishment LPCB LPS 1204 Certification

Home Office Guidance 
Government of the United Kingdom Home Office fire safety guidance documents for business recommend the use of Third Party Certificated products and services for fire protection.

"Third-party certification schemes for fire protection products and related services are an effective means of providing the fullest possible assurances, offering a level of quality, reliability and safety that non-certificated products may lack. This does not mean goods and services that are not third-party approved are less reliable, but there is no obvious way in which this can be demonstrated.

Third-party quality assurance can offer comfort both as a means of satisfying you that goods and services you have purchased are fit for purpose, and as a means of demonstrating that you have complied with the law."
- Section 8 Quality assurance of fire protection equipment and installation

References

Fire and rescue in the United Kingdom
Organisations based in Gloucestershire